The United States Armed Forces awards and decorations are primarily the medals, service ribbons, and specific badges which recognize military service and personal accomplishments while a member of the U.S. Armed Forces. Such awards are a means to outwardly display the highlights of a service member's career.

U.S. military awards currently issued to service members

General order of precedence
The precedence of particular awards will vary slightly among the different branches of service. All awards and decorations may be awarded to any service member unless otherwise designated by name or notation.

Note: The precedence of the Purple Heart was immediately before the Good Conduct Medals until changed to its current precedence in 1985.

Military departments
 Inter-service
 Army
 Navy and Marine Corps
 Air Force and Space Force
 Coast Guard

To denote additional achievements or multiple awards of the same decoration, the United States military maintains a number of award devices which are pinned to service ribbons and medals.

Inactive and obsolete awards
U.S. military personnel having received these awards have participated within these areas of combat/conflict during the time these awards were given to U.S. service members. Such awards have since been discontinued or are no longer applicable in terms of receiving these commendations.

Discontinued or proposed

The following decorations were designed for issuance with an approved medal, but were either never officially approved for presentation or were discontinued before a first award could be made.

Single service awards

Single service awards were official military decorations created as one time awards to recognize a single event.  The first such single service award was issued during the Spanish–American War by the Revenue Cutter Service to honor the actions of the vessel USRC Hudson during the Battle of Cárdenas.  The last single service award was issued in 1960 when Congress authorized the awarding of the Four Chaplains' Medal recognizing the Four Chaplains who died together during World War II. There have been no single service awards issued since by the U.S. military, mainly due to the decline and complications of awarding commemorative service medals.

Unofficial decorations

Unofficial decorations are those military awards created and issued by local commanders.  In most cases, unofficial awards were designed to commemorate a specific battle or engagement of a commander's unit.  The most well known unofficial awards were issued during the American Civil War.

After the Civil War, stricter military regulations prohibited local commanders from issuing awards and the practice had fallen into disuse by the 20th century.  Even so, the Department of Defense has stated that large numbers of unofficial medals were privately issued to members of the Armed Forces of the United States for many years after the Civil War, mostly to commemorate specific battles, events, or as private veteran memorabilia. One of the more well known is the Walter Reed Medal (recognized today as a Congressional Gold Medal), awarded for exploratory scientific achievement in the field of malaria treatment.  While presented as a gold medallion, members of the military were reported to wear a red ribbon on their uniforms to denote the decoration.

Foreign and international awards

Foreign and international decorations are authorized for wear on United States military uniforms by the Department of Defense in accordance with established regulations for the receipt of such awards as outlined by the State Department.  In the case of foreign decorations, the awards may be divided into senior service decorations (awarded only to high ranking U.S. officers), heroic decorations for valor, and foreign service decorations.

There are hundreds of foreign and international awards which have been approved for issuance to United States military personnel since World War I, the following being among the more common.

During the First and Second World Wars, the Croix de Guerre medals of France and Belgium, as well as the French Military Medal and Luxembourg War Cross, were further issued as unit citation cords, known as Fourragère.  Service members could receive both the individual award and the unit cord; in the case of the later, the unit citation could either be worn temporarily while a member of the unit or permanently if the service member was present during the actual battle which warranted the unit citation.  A further unit citation cord of the Order of William of the Netherlands was also issued during World War II, and was far more commonly known as the "Orange Lanyard".

As of 2002, South Korea has again issued the Korean Presidential Unit Citation to certain units of the United States Marine Corps, thus placing this previously obsolete foreign award back on the active order of precedence for U.S. decorations.  Apart from this one decoration, most 21st century foreign military awards are reserved for only the most senior flag and general officers and then only presented as "end of tour" decorations upon transfer from a major command.

See also
To display devices on Wikipedia pages, use Template:Ribbon devices.
Awards and decorations of the United States government
Merchant Marine
Awards and decorations of the Public Health Service
Awards and decorations of the National Oceanic and Atmospheric Administration
Civilian decorations of the United States
Awards and decorations of the National Guard
Awards and decorations of the State Defense Forces
Military decorations of the Cold War
Awards and decorations of the Vietnam War
United States military award devices
Military badges of the United States
Badges of the United States Air Force
Badges of the United States Army
Badges of the United States Coast Guard
Badges of the United States Marine Corps
Badges of the United States Navy
Badges of the United States Space Force
Obsolete badges of the United States military
Identification badges of the Uniform Services of the United States
Unofficial combat badges of the United States Army
List of military decorations
State decoration
Army-Navy "E" Award
Medal inflation

References

Further reading

External links

 Decorations and Medals - Ribbons - Order of Precedence at the Institute of Heraldry website
 U.S. Army Symbols and Insignia
 The Institute of Heraldry, U.S. Army
 U.S. Navy Service and Campaign Medals
 Wear and Appearance of Army Uniforms and Insignia (in PDF format)
 Military Awards (U.S. Army)(in PDF format) 
 

Devices and accouterments of United States military awards
 
Armed Forces
United States military-related lists